The 2014–15 Liga Gimel season saw 110 clubs competing in 8 regional divisions for promotion to Liga Bet.

Beitar Kafr Kanna (Upper Galilee), F.C. Tzeirei Kafr Kanna (Lower Galilee), Ihud Bnei Baqa (Jezreel), F.C. Haifa Ruby Shapira (Samaria), Hapoel Pardesiya (Sharon), Ironi Beit Dagan (Tel Aviv), F.C. Holon Yaniv (Central) and Maccabi Segev Shalom (South) all won their respective divisions and were promoted to Liga Bet.

Upper Galilee Division

Lower Galilee Division

Jezreel Division

Samaria Division

Sharon Division

Tel Aviv Division

Central Division

South Division

References

External links
Liga Gimel Upper Galilee The Israel Football Association 
Liga Gimel Lower Galilee The Israel Football Association 
Liga Gimel Jezreel The Israel Football Association 
Liga Gimel Samaria The Israel Football Association 
Liga Gimel Sharon  The Israel Football Association 
Liga Gimel Tel Aviv  The Israel Football Association 
Liga Gimel Central The Israel Football Association 
Liga Gimel South The Israel Football Association 

5
Liga Gimel seasons
Israel Liga Gimel